Stewarton is a town in East Ayreshire, Scotland.

Stewarton, Stuart Town, and similar names may also refer to:

 Stewarton, Argyll, Scotland; a village
 Stewarton, Queensland, Australia;  a locality in the Central Highlands Region
 Stewarton, Victoria, Australia
 Stewarttown, Ontario, Canada; neighborhood in Halton Hills
 Stuarton, Wigtownshire, Scotland; former name for Kirkcolm, a village and parish
 Stuart Town, New South Wales, Australia; a town on the Central Western Slopes
 Kirkcolm (formerly Stewarton), Dumfries and Galloway, Scotland

See also
 Stuart Towne, pen name of Clayton Rawson (1906–71) an American mystery writer
 Stewartstown (disambiguation)